Albion Congregational Church was built on Sneinton Road in Nottingham in 1856. It is a Grade II listed building.

History
The church opened in 1895. It was built to designs by Thomas Oliver and William Booker. It was enlarged in 1904 with the addition of a rear extension and a chamber for the organ.

In the early 1970s, in common with most other Congregational Churches in England, the Albion Congregational Church joined the United Reformed Church. In 1986, faced with unaffordable repair and maintenance costs, the congregation joined with Dales United Reformed Church in Bakersfield.

The building was then used by the Macedon Trust, and became the Albion Night Shelter.

References

Churches completed in 1856
Homelessness in England
Grade II listed churches in Nottinghamshire
Congregational churches in Nottingham